Acrocercops isodelta is a moth of the family Gracillariidae, known from Sri Lanka and India. It was described by Edward Meyrick in 1908. The hostplants for the species include Colebrookea oppositifolia and Elsholtzia fruticosa.

References

isodelta
Moths of Asia
Moths described in 1908